Rzędzian is a fictional character created by Henryk Sienkiewicz. He appears as the secondary character in With Fire and Sword and in The Deluge. He is a poor Polish nobleman who serves Jan Skrzetuski. He's cunning and greedy but always loyal to his master. He helps to free Helena Kurcewiczówna from Bohun. His parents and 91-year-old grandfather live in Rzędziany.

In The Deluge he is a wealthy nobleman and starosta of Wąsocze.

In Jerzy Hoffman's film Rzędzian is portrayed by Wojciech Malajkat.

References 

Characters in novels of the 19th century
Literary characters introduced in 1884
Sienkiewicz's Trilogy
Fictional Polish people